Elsenborn-Butgenbach Air Base  is a military aerodrome located  north-northwest of Butgenbach, Liège, Wallonia, Belgium.

See also
List of airports in Belgium

References

External links 
 

Airports in Liège Province
Bütgenbach